Mampsis (Medieval Greek: Μάμψις) or Memphis (Ancient Greek: Μέμφις), today Mamshit, Arabic Kurnub, is a former Nabataean caravan stop and Byzantine city. In the Nabataean period, Mampsis was an important station on the Incense Road, connecting Southern Arabia through Edom, the Arabah and Ma'ale Akrabim, to the Mediterranean ports, as well as to Jerusalem via Beersheba and Hebron. The once-luxurious houses feature unusual architecture not found in any other Nabataean city.

The reconstructed city gives the visitor a sense of how Mampsis once looked. Entire streets have survived intact, and there are also large groups of Nabataean buildings with open rooms, courtyards, and terraces. The stones are carefully chiseled and the arches that support the ceiling are remarkably well constructed.

The Incense Route - Desert Cities in the Negev, including Mampsis, Haluza, Avdat, and Shivta, were declared a World Heritage Site by UNESCO in June 2005.

Name
The Medieval Greek name Mampsis (Μαμψις) appears on the Madaba map and in the writings of Church Fathers.

The Negev Naming Committee chose to Hebraize the name as Mamshit (ממשית), with one committee member stating that it is "impossible to leave the name Mampsis because it's a foreign name"; the committee concluded that Mamshit was the original Hebrew name, which had been distorted by the Greeks.

Kurnub is a drink made from camel milk and date honey.

History

Mampsis was founded in the 1st century BCE as trade post between Petra and Gaza. Also based on agriculture, it continued to develop over time.
When its trade with the Roman occupation waned, the city developed a lucrative trade breeding fine horses, notably, the renowned Arabian horse.

During the Byzantine period Mampsis received support from the authorities as a frontier city until the time of Justinian I. When this funding ceased, the city went into decline and had practically ceased to exist by the middle of the 6th century C.E.

Before the founding of the State of Israel, Prime Minister to-be David Ben-Gurion saw Mampsis as the capital of the future country, which dovetailed with his dream of settling the Negev Desert.

Discoveries
Two churches were discovered in Mampsis. The western St. Nilus Church has a mosaic floor with colourful geometric patterns, birds, a fruit basket, and five dedications in Greek. The eastern church has a lectern on small marble pillars, the remnants of which can be seen at the site.

The biggest hoard ever found in Israel was discovered in Mampsis, consisting of 10,500 silver coins with a total weight of 72 kg. Other findings include a lead ingot with its foundry markings, a collection of ancient Greek texts on papyrus, and other objects indicative of wealth.

Gallery

References

External links
Mamshit National Park - official site
Incense Route - Desert Cities in the Negev, UNESCO
Pictures of Mamshit archeological findings
 Mamshit Detailed track and hiking info from Tourism, trip and travel to Israel

Nabataean sites in Israel
National parks of Israel
Nabataean architecture
World Heritage Sites in Israel
Populated places established in the 1st century BC
Former populated places in Southwest Asia
Buildings and structures in Southern District (Israel)
Tourist attractions in Southern District (Israel)
Protected areas of Southern District (Israel)